Kay is a given name.

Kay may also refer to:

People
 Kay (surname), including a list of people with the name
 Kay (footballer)
 Kay (singer)
 Kay (vizier), an Ancient Egyptian official

Places
 Kay, Iran
 Kay County, Oklahoma, United States
 Kay Island, Antarctica
 Kay Park, Scotland
 Kay Peak, Antarctica

Other uses
 Kay Computers
 Kay Jewelers
 Kay Musical Instrument Company
Kay, an album by John Wesley Ryles
 "Kay" (song), its title track
 'kay, short for okay, a term of approval or assent
 An epithet for a ruler of the mythological Kayanian dynasty

See also
 K, the eleventh letter in the Latin alphabet
 Kaylee
 Kai (disambiguation)
 Khay (disambiguation)
 Kaye (disambiguation)
 Kaya (disambiguation)